The short-tail alpine garter snake (Thamnophis scaliger) is a species of snake of the family Colubridae. It is found in Mexico.

References 

Thamnophis
Reptiles described in 1863
Taxa named by Giorgio Jan
Reptiles of Mexico